Automated Processes Inc. (API) is an American company that designs, manufactures, and markets mixing consoles and signal processors, including modular signal processor units in the 500-series format standard that evolved from early API mixing consoles.

History

In 1967, Lou Lindauer and Saul Walker designed a mixing console for Apostolic Recording Studio, the first 12-track recording studio in New York City. Two years later, in 1969, Walker and Lindauer co-founded Automated Processes, Inc. and introduced their first commercial mixing console, whose modular design combined numerous 500-series format signal processor units. The console was sold to Sound Ideas in New York.

Over the course of the next decade, API mixing consoles and processors achieved considerable popularity in recording studios, including Decca, The Hit Factory, Sunset Sound, RAK Studios; major broadcast facilities, including ABC, NBC, CBS, BBC; and others, including Eastman School of Music, the White House, Washington National Cathedral, the United States Marine Band. Notable users included Les Paul, Jimmy Page, Leon Russell, The Doobie Brothers, Bob Dylan, Marvin Gaye, and Stevie Wonder.

In 1978, Datatronix licensed the rights to API from the owners. Founder Saul Walker and most of the original engineers, including Sid Zimet, Michael Tapes, and Paul Galburt, who had designed the API 554 sweep and the 954 automated equalizers, went to work for Sound Workshop.

In 1985, the assets of API were purchased by Paul Wolff, who owned the company until 1999. Wolff introduced the API Lunchbox, a portable lunchbox-sized chassis for housing up to four API 500-series modules.

In 1988, Audio Toys, Inc. (ATI) was founded as a manufacturer of live sound reinforcement products including the Paragon live mixing console. In 1999 the assets of API were purchased by ATI, and ATI improved quality control, manufacturing and availability of the API product line, re-establishing API as one of the leading American analog pro audio manufacturers. New product introductions, including the Vision surround-capable studio console, as well as the re-engineering of the 1604 small-frame mixing console into the 1608 brought the API sound to a new generation of musicians and engineers.

Popularity in the 500-series format surged in the mid-2000s, and in 2006 API established the VPR Alliance, which established specification standards for the voltage, current draw, physical dimensions, and connection pins of 500-series modules to ensure compatibility with API 500-series rack systems.

Products

500-series

API's modular design allows individual signal processor modules to be added to a recording system as budget allows. API's 500-series modules include the 512C preamplifier, the 525 compressor, the 527 compressor, the 550A and 550B semi-parametric equalizers, and the 560 graphic equalizer.

 505-DI: Direct Input
 512c: Mic/Line Preamp
 512v: Mic/Line Preamp
 525: Compressor
 527: Compressor
 529: Stereo Compressor
 535-LA: Line Amplifier
 550A: 3-band Equalizer
 550b: 4-band Equalizer
 560: Graphic Equalizer
 565: Filter Bank
 8 Slot High Current Lunchbox
 6 Slot High Current Lunch Box
 500 VPR 10-slot Rack

References

External links

 
 Service website
 NAMM Oral History Program - Saul Walker

Audio equipment manufacturers of the United States
Manufacturers of professional audio equipment
Electronics companies established in 1968
Audio mixing console manufacturers
Manufacturing companies based in Maryland
1968 establishments in New York (state)